Tipiqucha (Quechua tipi Pennisetum clandestinum (a grass species), tipiy to husk maize, to snap, to break, qucha lake, hispanicized spelling Tipicocha) is a lake in Apurimac Region, Grau Province, Chuquibambilla District, Peru. It lies west of the lake Pachachaka (Pachachaca).

See also
List of lakes in Peru

References

Lakes of Peru
Lakes of Apurímac Region